This page is a list of geography topics.

Geography is the study of the world and of the distribution of life on the earth, including human life and the effects of human activity. Geography research addresses both the questions of where, as well as why, geographical phenomena occur. Geography is a diverse field that seeks to understand the world and all of its human and natural complexities—not merely where objects are, but how they came to be, and how they have changed since then.

0–9
3D city models

A
Anatopism -
Ancient Indian subcontinent -
Arbia's law of geography-
Atlantic World -

B
Behavioral geography -
Biogeography -
Border -
British Cartographic Society -

C
Cartography -
Chevron (land form) -
Climatology -
Continental Island -
Cross-border town naming -
Cultural geography -
Cultural region -
China -

D
Demography -
Development geography -
Digital orthophoto quadrangle -
Direction (geometry, geography) -
Distance decay -

E
Earth -
Economic geography -
Ecogovernmentality -
Ethnography -
Extreme environment -

F
Feminist geography -
Field (geography) -
Fundamental plane (spherical coordinates) -

G
Gazetteer -
Geoarchaeology -
Geodesy -
Geographic feature -
Geographic information science -
Geographic targeting -
Geographers on Film -
Geography and wealth -
Geomorphology -
Geopolitics -
Geostatistics -
Glossary of geography terms -
Governmentality -

H
Health geography -
Hermit kingdom -
Historical geography -
History of geography -
Household electricity approach -
Human ecology -
Human settlement -
Hydrology

I
Ice island -
Incorporation of nature within a city -
Indian subcontinent -
Indices of deprivation 2004 -
Indices of deprivation 2007 -
Intermontane -

K
Kappa effect -

L
Land cover -
Landform -
Landlocked developing countries -
Landscape connectivity -
Landscape ecology -
Linear Reference System -

M
Map -
Military geography -
Minimum bounding rectangle -
Muslim world -

N
Nunatak hypothesis -

P
Palaeogeography -
Pedology -
Philosophy of geography -
Place -
Place identity -
Political ecology -
Political geography -
Population density -
Population geography -
Poquoson (geographic term) -
Provisional Administrative Line -

R
Rank-size distribution -
Region -
Regional geography -
Rock-cut basin -

S
Sense of place -
Small Island Developing States -
Snow line -
Social geography -
South American capital cities -
Spatial analysis -
Strategic geography -
Subregion -
Swath width

T
Technical geography-
Time geography -
Tidewater (geographic term) -
Tobler's first law of geography-
Tobler's second law of geography-
Tourism geography -
Traditional knowledge GIS -
Transportation geography -
Triangulated irregular network -
Tropical geography

U
Urban geography -
Urban semiotics

See also

 Outline of geography
 Lists of places

Geography